Adeem the Artist (born Kyle Bingham), and sometimes known as Adeem Maria, is an American country music singer. They have released eight albums and a number of singles.

Musical career
Adeem the Artist was born Kyle Bingham in 1988. They were born in Locust, North Carolina but when they were 12 years old, their family moved to Syracuse, New York. When Adeem was in their 20s, they began performing on cruise ships. They later moved to Knoxville, Tennessee with the intent of being a pastor, but later abandoned this plan and began recording music. In 2016, they performed tribute shows for John Prine and Joni Mitchell in Knoxville.

In 2021, after releasing several independent albums on Bandcamp, Adeem released the album Cast-Iron Pansexual. Adeem largely funded the album through Patreon and wrote most of its songs in 2020. They premiered its tracks on the website Audio Femme that March.

Rolling Stone editors Jon Freeman and Joseph Hudak selected the title track of Cast Iron Pansexual as a "pick of the week" after the album's release, stating that the song "stakes out their place as a born Southerner armed with a radical outlook and a brain that won’t just ease up". American Songwriter described Adeem as having a "scruffy timbre". The editors of this site also selected "I Wish You Would've Been a Cowboy", a response to Toby Keith's 1993 hit "Should've Been a Cowboy". Adeem co-wrote the song, which is critical of Keith's patriotism, with Palestinian-American poet Summer Awad. Steve Wildsmith of The Daily Times wrote that the album had a "rich currency of exploration, past-life condemnation and present-day illumination." Following the success of this album, they began touring with American Aquarium in 2021. In April 2022, Adeem signed with Thirty Tigers after contacting the label's owner on Twitter. They announced plans to release their first album for the label later in the year. "Middle of a Heart" was also released from the album in October 2022, followed by "Run This Town" a month later. Their first Thirty Tigers album White Trash Revelry was released in December 2022.

Personal life
Adeem the Artist is non-binary and uses they/them pronouns. They are also pansexual and married to their wife Hannah. Adeem told The Daily Times in 2021 that some of the themes of Cast Iron Pansexual deal with their own gender and sexual identity issues, particularly since they grew up in a Christian household in the Southern United States.

Discography

Albums 

 The Living Room Tapes (2011)
 armour. (2012)
 [syracuse.] (2013)
 Kyle Adem Is Dead (2016)
 Live Recordings (2017)
 Forgotten Songs & American Dreams (2019)
 Cast Iron Pansexual (2021)
 White Trash Revelry (2022)

EPs 

 Beautiful Dreamer (2014)
 The Owl (2017)
 The Flamingo (2017)

Singles 

 "Sidewalk" (2015)
 "5th Avenue Homicide" (2017)
 "The Last Summer" (2017)
 "Scruffy Little Christmas" (2017)
 "Pandemic Days" (2020)
 "Ashes in Flight" (2020)
 "Tiger Prince of Knoxville" (2020)
 "Asheville Blues" (2021)
 "Merry Christmas, Urgent Care" (2021)
 "I Wish You Would've Been a Cowboy" (2021)
 "Going to Hell" (2022)

References

External links
Official website

American country singer-songwriters
LGBT people from North Carolina
American LGBT singers
Living people
Non-binary musicians
Pansexual musicians
1988 births
Country musicians from North Carolina
Thirty Tigers artists
Pansexual non-binary people
21st-century American LGBT people